The Bauer cabinet (German: Kabinett Bauer) was the second democratically elected Reichsregierung of the German Reich. It was named after Reichsministerpräsident (head of government) Gustav Bauer and took office on 21 June 1919 when it replaced the Scheidemann cabinet. Although the Weimar Constitution was not in force yet, it is generally counted as the second government of the Weimar Republic.

It was initially based on a coalition of the Social Democratic Party of Germany (SPD) and the Zentrum. The German Democratic Party (DDP) had refused to support signing the Treaty of Versailles, over which the Scheidemann Cabinet had resigned on 20 June 1919. The DDP rejoined the Bauer cabinet on 3 October 1919, thus restoring the original Weimar Coalition of centre-left parties. The Bauer cabinet resigned on 27 March 1920 as a result of the Kapp-Lüttwitz Putsch and was followed by the government of Hermann Müller.

Election and establishment
The government of Gustav Bauer was created under great time pressure and under extraordinary circumstances. Early on 20 June 1919, the government of Philipp Scheidemann resigned since it was unable to agree on a common stance towards the Allied ultimatum to sign the Treaty of Versailles or face a resumption of hostilities. Germany had less than five days to accept. A refusal to sign was widely feared to result in the dismemberment of the German state, occupation by foreign troops and a possible plunge into the chaos of civil war.

At a loss of how to proceed, the Scheidemann cabinet had seriously considered handing over supreme authority over the Reich to the Allies. It had been unprepared for the complete refusal of the Allies to negotiate the Treaty's terms. After its resignation, it fell to president Friedrich Ebert and the majority parties of the Weimar National Assembly to create a new government and to decide whether to sign the Treaty. Out of this crisis emerged the Bauer cabinet.

The parties themselves were split, their internal debates between those for and against signing were still ongoing. A slight majority in favour of signing seemed to emerge. Under the leadership of Matthias Erzberger, the Zentrum was willing to sign provided some "dishonourable" clauses would be struck from the text, the Social Democrats advocated a separate, parallel note of protest. However, the DDP, which had been most vocal among the coalition parties in opposing the Treaty, insisted on making substantial changes to the Treaty the condition for its acceptance. This was seen as a tactical move, trying to preserve the appearance of willingness to compromise whilst remaining true to their principles.

Threats by Reichspräsident Ebert to resign and even the readiness of SPD and Zentrum to accept the DDP's demands, failed to bring the Democrats on board. On the morning of 21 June, the DDP forbade its members from taking positions in a new cabinet. This made it impossible for those in the DDP who were in favour of signing (like Hugo Preuss and Bernhard Dernburg) to cooperate and also posed a problem for the Zentrum which previously had refused to entertain the idea of a coalition without the Democrats. Ebert, who had promised "never" to call for a cabinet based only on SPD and Zentrum, now had to give in. The Social Democrats in the Assembly had named Eduard David, who next to Erzberger had been the member of the old cabinet most supportive of the Treaty, as candidate for head of government. Hermann Müller, the SPD chairman, was also seen as a favourite by the public.

On the morning of 21 June, Müller presented the SPD fraction with an almost complete cabinet list (virtually identical with the cabinet eventually appointed). David had declined to become head of government for "health reasons". According to Müller, Gustav Noske, Rudolf Wissell and Robert Schmidt were all needed in their respective posts as ministers. Thus former Minister of Labour, Gustav Bauer was named as candidate for Ministerpräsident, although he had been quite vocal in his opposition to the Treaty. The Social Democratic fraction was surprised by this. They asked Müller to become head of government himself, but he refused. Overall, the formation of the cabinet occurred with minimal involvement by the SPD fraction, for which Müller had to justify himself shortly before the initial meeting of the cabinet. President Ebert apparently had exercised a lot of influence on events (to which he was entitled under §8 of the Gesetz über die vorläufige Reichsgewalt, the temporary constitution). Since Bauer was a friend of Ebert, the president likely did not intend for him to "take a fall" as the head of government who had to sign the hated Treaty. However, Bauer was not the great leadership personality who could be confidently expected to successfully deal with the huge challenges posed by complying with the Treaty while fending off internal dissent (both from the left and the right). Ebert's choice is seen today as a reflection of the fact that Ebert himself had only grudgingly accepted the inevitability of signing the Treaty shortly before the Cabinet Scheidemann resigned. In contrast to those like David who had argued in favour of signing from the start, Bauer was—like Ebert—a reluctant convert. The choice of Bauer thus was based on a mutual feeling of party solidarity among the two Social Democrats willing to take responsibility for the consequences of the lost war and Bauer's personal friendship with Ebert.

Bauer took on the thankless task and on 22 June declared in the National Assembly:Wir stehen nicht aus Parteiinteresse und noch weniger – das werden Sie mir glauben – aus Ehrgeiz an dieser Stelle. Wir stehen hier aus Pflichtgefühl, aus dem Bewußtsein, daß es unsere verdammte Schuldigkeit ist, zu retten, was zu retten ist. ("We are not standing here out of the interest of our parties, and even less—believe me—out of ambition. We are standing here out of a feeling of responsibility, in the awareness that it is our damned duty to save what can be saved.") A final attempt to have the so-called Schmachartikel ("articles of shame") 227 to 231 removed from the Treaty was rejected by the Allies. From the very moment of its inception, the Bauer cabinet was thus tainted in the eyes of many in Germany, both for its submissive acceptance and its failure to negotiate an improvement in the Treaty.

At that point there were rumours of an impending military coup and the Zentrum started to reconsider its support for signing. Ministers Johannes Bell and  now argued for a rejection of the Treaty. It was only the clear message sent by General Wilhelm Groener at the Oberste Heeresleitung (OHL) that a resumption of hostilities would be "hopeless", which prevented the speedy collapse of the Cabinet Bauer.

Overview of the members
The members of the cabinet (known collectively as Reichsministerium until the Weimar constitution came into force in August 1919, when the official name became Reichsregierung) were as follows:

Notes: The Reichsverkehrsministerium was newly created in 1919, Bell became the first minister on 5 November 1919. On 15 September 1919 the Reichsernährungsministerium was merged with the Reichswirtschaftsministerium. The affairs of the Reichskolonialministerium were transferred on 7 November 1919 to the Reichsministerium für Wiederaufbau, newly created on 25 October 1919. Walther Reinhardt, Preussischer Kriegsminister until the institution's dissolution in September 1919, on 1 October became Chef der Heeresleitung, retaining his (non-voting) seat in the cabinet.

Kapp-Lüttwitz-Putsch and resignation

After the end of the Kapp-Lüttwitz-Putsch on 17 March 1920, union and left-wing leaders like Carl Legien, Arthur Crispien and Rudolf Hilferding put pressure on the government that had just returned to the capital. On 22 March, the unions made an end to the general strike conditional on concessions by the government: withdrawal of troops from Berlin and a decisive influence of organized labour on the make-up of the next cabinet. Ultimately, the Cabinet Bauer had to resign because it had been unable to prevent the Kapp-Lüttwitz-Putsch. It was to be replaced by a cabinet of politicians not discredited by the charge of having voluntarily or involuntarily aided and abetted the putschists. This government was the Cabinet Müller which took office on 27 March 1920.

References

Coalition governments of Germany
Historic German cabinets
German Revolution of 1918–1919
1919 establishments in Germany
1920 disestablishments in Germany
Cabinets established in 1919
Cabinets disestablished in 1920